Vipul Goel (born 25 April 1972) is an Indian politician and sitting Member of Legislative Assembly, representing Faridabad constituency of Haryana Legislative Assembly, belonging to Bhartiya Janata Party.

Early life 
He completed his graduation in bachelor of commerce from University of Delhi in 1992. His father is Late Sh. Rotash Chand Goel. He is married to Pallavi Goel and has one son and two daughters. By profession, he is a business person.

Political career 
Vipul Goel won the 2014 Haryana Legislative Assembly election for Bharatiya Janata Party, defeating Anand Kaushik of Indian National Congress.
He is the chairman of Navchetna Trust, an initiative that helps in the development of society and its people. It aims to provide advancement in education to students. It also works towards the cleanliness of the city and making Faridabad a green city, so that all other cities follow along. The trust's main focus is to bring change in environmental conservation, patient care, and science. An NGO, which works on social issues like Beti Bachao (Save Girl Child), and Swachchh Bharat (Clean India). One of the primary functions of trust is the attempt to build on the inevitably social interests both of children and adults type of group experience which will be individually developing and socially useful.

Vipul Goel was designated as the Cabinet Minister on 22 July 2016 during the reshuffling and extension of Haryana Government of CM Sh Manohar Lal Khattar. He was assigned the Ministry of Industries and Commerce, Ministry of Environment and Ministry of Industrial Training.

He always participates in social events and helps the needy ones. His efforts through this trust include supporting already existing programs in education, health, culture, justice and the social well-being of the people of India. He is constantly giving his efforts to increase the quality of living of the people. The commitment of his to the charity makes him one of the most charitable people across the nation. He supports people in education, healthcare, religious, social and community-related causes irrespective of gender and race. There are many initiatives taken by him that focus on improving the quality and equity of school education in India. He has good critical thinking skills and a caring attitude toward the poor, needy and disabled. He always provides funds to add value to the society and helps in developing a better tomorrow.

On 3 March 2015, world's largest and tallest Indian flag was hoisted by BJP President Amit Shah, Haryana Chief Minister Manohar Lal Khattar, Actor Ranbir Kapoor.  It was an initiative of Vipul Goel's Navchetna Trust.

MLA Vipul Goel launched free WiFi service in Sector 15 market of Faridabad in January 2016.

Goel is the Industry minister in Haryana Government.

Awards
Bharat Gaurav Award 2021

References

External links

 Vidhan Sabha Profile Govt. of India website

1972 births
Living people
People from Faridabad
Bharatiya Janata Party politicians from Haryana
Haryana MLAs 2014–2019